Glen Harry Macnow (born April 23, 1955) is a Philadelphia, Pennsylvania sports talk radio host on 94 WIP.

Background
Macnow was born in New York City on April 23, 1955, and raised in Buffalo, New York. He went to Boston University (with WIP co-worker Al Morganti), and worked a newspaper career that took him from Cocoa Beach, Florida to Fort Lauderdale, Florida to Detroit, Michigan, and, finally to The Philadelphia Inquirer in 1986. During his time with the Inquirer, in 1993, he was recognized as "The Best Sportswriter in Philadelphia" by Philadelphia magazine.

Glen is often referred to as "The Prof" or "The Professor" due to his position as an instructor at St. Joseph's University.

He is married to his wife Judy and is the father of two sons, Ted and Alex.

Writer
Macnow has written more than a dozen children's books, mostly sports biographies. He has also written three top-selling Philadelphia sports books during his time on WIP. In 2003, he co-authored The Great Philadelphia Fan Book with Anthony Gargano. The book is a Philadelphia sports memoir, centering on the city's sports fans and 4 professional teams.  In 2004, he co-authored The Great Philadelphia Sports Debate with Angelo Cataldi. In 2006, he co-authored The Great Book of Philadelphia Sports Lists with Edward Gudonis, a.k.a. Big Daddy Graham.

Macnow is known for some of his off-sports shows, including the "Movie Club for Men," a regular summer feature, and his annual "food hunt," which searches for the best of a particular "manly" food item (burgers, pizza, ribs, cheesesteaks, etc.) in the Delaware Valley. He also co-hosts a show with Don Russell a.k.a. Joe Sixpack, called What's Brewing, in which they travel to local breweries and beer retailers, mainly in the Bucks County area, to talk about their year round and seasonal offerings. It airs on NBCSports Philadelphia on Saturday nights at 11 p.m.

Bibliography
Alex Rodriguez (Sports Great) 
Allen Iverson (Sports Great) 
Cal Ripken, Jr. (Sports Great) 
Cal Ripken, Jr.: Star Shortstop (Sports Reports) 
Charles Barkley (Sports Great Books) 
Chris Webber (Sports Great) 
David Robinson: Star Center (Sports Reports) 
Deion Sanders (Sports Great) 
Denver Broncos Football Team (Great Sports Teams), The 
Great Book of Philadelphia Sports Lists, The 
Great Philadelphia Fan Book, The  
Great Philadelphia Sports Debate, The 
Jeff Gordon (Sports Great) 
Ken Griffey, Jr: Star Outfielder (Sports Reports) 
Kevin Garnett (Sports Great) 
Kobe Bryant (Sports Great) 
Philadelphia 76ers Basketball Team, The (Great Sports Teams) 
Philadelphia Flyers Hockey Team (Great Sports Teams), The 
Shaquille O'Neal: Star Center (Sports Reports) 
Tiger Woods (Sports Great) 
Troy Aikman (Sports Great)

References 

American children's writers
American sports radio personalities
Sportswriters from Pennsylvania
Boston University alumni
Radio personalities from Buffalo, New York
The Philadelphia Inquirer people
Radio personalities from Philadelphia
1955 births
Living people
Journalists from New York (state)
Sportswriters from New York (state)